Álvaro Martínez Beltrán (born 30 March 1974), known simply as Álvaro, is a Spanish former footballer who played as a goalkeeper.

Club career
Born in Vitoria-Gasteiz, Álava, Álvaro began his career with local CD Aurrerá de Vitoria, promoting to the Tercera División in his first season as a senior. In the summer of 1993 he signed with Basque giants Athletic Bilbao, playing his only two years at the professional level with the reserve side in Segunda División, being second choice.

Álvaro returned to his first club in 1995, going on to represent in the following 14 years Burgos CF, SD Lemona, UB Conquense, Benidorm CF, CD San Isidro, Cultural y Deportiva Leonesa and CP Villarrobledo, in both the Segunda División B and the fourth tier. He retired at the end of the 2009–10 campaign, after one year with amateurs AD San José Obrero (fifth division).

During his playing career, Álvaro also served as youth goalkeeper coach in the clubs he played for. After his retirement, he worked as a manager in youth teams.

References

External links

Official website 

1974 births
Living people
Footballers from Vitoria-Gasteiz
Spanish footballers
Association football goalkeepers
Segunda División players
Segunda División B players
Tercera División players
Bilbao Athletic footballers
Burgos CF footballers
SD Lemona footballers
UB Conquense footballers
Benidorm CF footballers
Cultural Leonesa footballers
Spanish football managers
Segunda División B managers
UB Conquense managers
CD Aurrerá de Vitoria footballers